Müjde Evrim Alasya (born 2 August 1979) is a Turkish actress.

Life and career 
She is a graduate of Dokuz Eylül University with a degree in theatre studies. She was a licensed athlete who participated in national and international competitions as a member of the Çimentaş Sports Club. Alasya, who started rhythmic gymnastics at the age of five, was a successful rhythmic gymnast in her high school years, but she eventually enrolled in the acting course of Konak Municipal Theater after finishing high school in 1997. She started her acting career in 1999 by joining the Pınar Children's Theatre. Alasya moved to Istanbul in 2003 to work in the Istanbul branch of the Pınar Children's Theatre and continued to work for them until 2006. She then joined the Acting Workshop, established in 1999 by Zuhal Olcay and Haluk Bilginer.

Alasya made her television debut with a minor role in the popular TV series Bir Istanbul Masalı. She was then noted for playing the role of the flirtatious singer "Balçiçek" in the TV series Gönülçelen in 2010. Her breakthrough came with her broef role in the historical drama Muhteşem Yüzyıl, in which she portrayed a young Hafsa Sultan. Between 2015 and 2016, she had a leading role in the series Güneşin Kızları. In 2020, her portrayal of the character Meliha in the TV series Kırmızı Oda was met with critical acclaim.

Theatre  
 Lokomapüf
 Androcles and the Lion
 Mutluluk Dağıtan Eskici
 Mavi Pullu Balık
 Yel Değirmeni
 Fırtına
 Ben Bir Kurbağayım
 Küçük Kız ve Yıldız
 Ayrılık
 Deli Dumrul
 Timon of Athens
 7 Şekspir Müzikali
 La Nuit de Valognes
 İki Bekar

Filmography

References

External links 
 
 

Living people
1979 births
Turkish stage actresses
Turkish film actresses
Turkish television actresses